The 54th parallel north is a circle of latitude that is 54 degrees north of the Earth's equatorial plane. It crosses Europe, Asia, the Pacific Ocean, North America, and the Atlantic Ocean.

At this latitude, the sun is visible for 17 hours, 9 minutes during the summer solstice and 7 hours, 22 minutes during the winter solstice.

Around the world

Starting at the Prime Meridian (in the North Sea southeast of Bridlington, East Riding of Yorkshire, England) and heading eastwards, the parallel 54° north passes through:

{| class="wikitable plainrowheaders"
! scope="col" width="125" | Co-ordinates
! scope="col" | Country, territory or sea
! scope="col" | Notes
|-
| style="background:#b0e0e6;" | 
! scope="row" style="background:#b0e0e6;" | North Sea
| style="background:#b0e0e6;" |
|-
| 
! scope="row" |  
| State of Schleswig-Holstein
|-
| style="background:#b0e0e6;" | 
! scope="row" style="background:#b0e0e6;" | Baltic Sea
| style="background:#b0e0e6;" | Bay of Lübeck
|-
| 
! scope="row" | 
| State of Mecklenburg-Vorpommern
|-
| style="background:#b0e0e6;" | 
! scope="row" style="background:#b0e0e6;" | Baltic Sea
| style="background:#b0e0e6;" | Bay of Wismar
|-
| 
! scope="row" | 
| Island of Poel, mainland, and island of Usedom
|-
| style="background:#b0e0e6;" | 
! scope="row" style="background:#b0e0e6;" | Baltic Sea
| style="background:#b0e0e6;" |
|-
| 
! scope="row" | 
| Island of Wolin, and mainland
|-
| 
! scope="row" | 
| Alytus County
|-
| 
! scope="row" | 
| For about 
|-
| 
! scope="row" | 
| For about 
|-
| 
! scope="row" | 
| Passing just north of Minsk
|-
| 
! scope="row" | 
| Smolensk Oblast
|-
| 
! scope="row" | 
| Kostanay Region
|-
| 
! scope="row" | 
| For about 
|-
| 
! scope="row" | 
| For about 
|-
| 
! scope="row" | 
| For about 
|-
| 
! scope="row" | 
| For about 
|-
| 
! scope="row" | 
| For about 
|-
| 
! scope="row" | 
|
|-
| 
! scope="row" | 
| For about 
|-
| 
! scope="row" | 
|
|-
| 
! scope="row" | 
| For about 
|-
| 
! scope="row" | 
|
|-
| 
! scope="row" | 
|
|-
| 
! scope="row" | 
| For about 
|-
| 
! scope="row" | 
|
|-
| 
! scope="row" | 
|
|-
| 
! scope="row" | 
| Passing through Lake Baikal
|-
| style="background:#b0e0e6;" | 
! scope="row" style="background:#b0e0e6;" | Sea of Okhotsk
| style="background:#b0e0e6;" |  
|-
| 
! scope="row" |  
|
|-
| style="background:#b0e0e6;" | 
! scope="row" style="background:#b0e0e6;" | Sea of Okhotsk
| style="background:#b0e0e6;" | Sakhalin Gulf
|-
| 
! scope="row" |  
| Island of Sakhalin
|-
| style="background:#b0e0e6;" | 
! scope="row" style="background:#b0e0e6;" | Sea of Okhotsk
| style="background:#b0e0e6;" |  
|-
| 
! scope="row" |  
| Kamchatka Peninsula
|-
| style="background:#b0e0e6;" | 
! scope="row" style="background:#b0e0e6;" | Pacific Ocean
| style="background:#b0e0e6;" | 
|-
| style="background:#b0e0e6;" | 
! scope="row" style="background:#b0e0e6;" | Bering Sea
| style="background:#b0e0e6;" | 
|-
| 
! scope="row" | 
| Alaska - Unalaska Island
|-valign="top"
| style="background:#b0e0e6;" | 
| style="background:#b0e0e6;" | Pacific Ocean
| style="background:#b0e0e6;" | Gulf of Alaska - passing just north of Unalga Island, and just south of Akutan Island, Rootok Island, Avatanak Island and Tigalda Island, Alaska, 
|-
| 
! scope="row" | 
| British Columbia - Graham Island
|-
| style="background:#b0e0e6;" | 
! scope="row" style="background:#b0e0e6;" | Hecate Strait
| style="background:#b0e0e6;" |
|-valign="top"
| 
! scope="row" | 
|-
| style="background:#b0e0e6;" | 
! scope="row" style="background:#b0e0e6;" | James Bay
| style="background:#b0e0e6;" |
|-valign="top"
| 
! scope="row" | 
| Quebec Newfoundland and Labrador
|-
| style="background:#b0e0e6;" | 
! scope="row" style="background:#b0e0e6;" | Atlantic Ocean
| style="background:#b0e0e6;" |
|-
| 
! scope="row" | 
| Achill IslandIrish mainland:
County Mayo
Lough Conn
County Mayo
County Sligo
County Roscommon
Lough Key
County Roscommon
County Leitrim
County Cavan (including Cavan Town at ) 
County Monaghan
County Louth (including Dundalk at ) 
|-
| style="background:#b0e0e6;" | 
! scope="row" style="background:#b0e0e6;" | Dundalk Bay
| style="background:#b0e0e6;" | For about 
|-
| 
! scope="row" | 
|  Cooley Peninsula
|-
| style="background:#b0e0e6;" | 
! scope="row" style="background:#b0e0e6;" | Irish Sea
| style="background:#b0e0e6;" | Passing just south of the 
|-
| 
! scope="row" | 
| England inc. Harrogate at 
|-
| style="background:#b0e0e6;" | 
! scope="row" style="background:#b0e0e6;" | North Sea
| style="background:#b0e0e6;" |
|}

See also
53rd parallel north
55th parallel north
Parallel 54°40′ north

References

n54